Love in the First is the debut album by American R&B artist Latif. The album was released on September 23, 2003, on the Motown label. It peaked at No. 67 on the Top R&B/Hip-Hop Albums chart.

Song information
The only single, "I Don't Wanna Hurt You" was written by Sean Garrett and Latif. About the creation of this song, Latif says that Garrett:

Track listing

References

2003 debut albums
Contemporary R&B albums by American artists
Motown albums